Eden Woon is an American academic, former military officer, and businessman. Woon currently serves as President of the American Chamber of Commerce in Hong Kong, beginning September 1, 2022.

Woon was formerly President of the Asian Institute of Technology, a graduate university located outside Bangkok, Thailand.

Woon was born in Shanghai in 1947, moving to Hong Kong in 1949. Woon served in the US Air Force, including a posting at the US Embassy in Beijing from 1983 to 1985, retiring as a Colonel in 1993. He later served as CEO of the Hong Kong General Chamber of Commerce from 1997 to 2006, and later as Vice President of Hong Kong University of Science and Technology.

References 

Living people
American academics
Academic staff of the Asian Institute of Technology
1947 births
University of Iowa alumni
University of Washington alumni